The surname Glick is a Yiddish or Ashkenazic variation of the German word Glück (luck/happiness). The name is also commonly found among Swiss and  Palatine Anabaptist immigrants to the United States. Notable people with the surname include:
 Alexis Glick, a national television personality who was a temporary host for the third hour of NBC's Today Show in 2006
 Alex Glick, a boy who, via charity raffle, won a minor appearance in a South Park episode, Red Man's Greed
Arie Gill-Glick (1930–2016), Israeli Olympic runner
 Caroline Glick, American-Israeli journalist, deputy managing editor of the Jerusalem Post
 Deborah Glick, the Democratic New York State Assembly member for the 66th Assembly District (lower Manhattan)
 Elmo Glick, pseudonym of songwriters Jerry Leiber and Mike Stoller
 George Washington Glick, an American politician
 Hirsh Glick, a poet from the Vilna Ghetto, writer of the lyrics for the partisan song Zog nit Keynmol
 Jeff Glick (d. 1985), American bridge player
 Jeremy Glick, a man who died in the September 11, 2001 attack and who fought back against the terrorists on United Airlines Flight 93
 Jiminy Glick, a fictional character portrayed by Martin Short in the TV series Primetime Glick (2001–2003)
 Larry Glick, a Boston radio talk show host
 Peter Glick, author, of Finding Father:Vietnam 50 years later
 Robert Glick, the Director of the Columbia University Center for Psychoanalytic Training and Research
 Roman Glick, bass guitarist for American rock band Jackyl
 Ruth Glick, best-selling author of healthy cookbooks and has also written dozens of romantic suspense novels under the pen name Rebecca York.
 Shimon Glick, Israeli physician
 , Jewish theologian
 Srul Irving Glick, composer, radio producer, conductor, teacher
 Stacey Glick, a former child actress
 Thomas F. Glick, historian of science
 Yehuda Glick, Israeli activist
  Mendel Glick, founder of Glick's Bakery chain in Melbourne 1966

Glik
 Kamil Jacek Glik (born 1988, Jastrzębie Zdrój), a Polish footballer
 Glik's, an American retail clothing chain based in Granite City, Illinois, founded in 1897 by Joseph Glik
 Glik, an Israeli chocolate brand, now sold under the brandname Klik

References

Jewish surnames